Euheterodonta is an subterclass of Mollusca in the class Bivalvia.

Families
Infraclass Euheterodonta
Superorder Anomalodesmata Dall, 1889
Superfamily Clavagelloidea d'Orbigny, 1844
Clavagellidae d'Orbigny, 1844
Penicillidae Gray, 1858
Superfamily Cuspidarioidea Dall, 1886
Cuspidariidae Dall, 1886
Halonymphidae Scarlato & Starobogatov, 1983
Protocuspidariidae Scarlato & Starobogatov, 1983
Spheniopsidae J. Gardner, 1928
Superfamily Myochamoidea Carpenter, 1861
Cleidothaeridae Hedley, 1918 (1870)
Myochamidae Carpenter, 1861
Superfamily Pandoroidea Rafinesque, 1815
Lyonsiidae P. Fischer, 1887
Pandoridae Rafinesque, 1815
Superfamily Pholadomyoidea King, 1844
Parilimyidae Morton, 1981
Pholadomyidae King, 1844
Superfamily Poromyoidea Dall, 1886
Cetoconchidae Ridewood, 1903
Poromyidae Dall, 1886
Superfamily Thracioidea Stoliczka, 1870 (1839)
Clistoconchidae Morton, 2012
Laternulidae Hedley, 1918 (1840)
Periplomatidae Dall, 1895
Thraciidae Stoliczka, 1870 (1839)
Superfamily Verticordioidea Stoliczka, 1870
Euciroidae Dall, 1895
Lyonsiellidae Dall, 1895
Verticordiidae Stoliczka, 1870
Superorder Imparidentia Bieler, P. M. Mikkelsen & Giribet, 2014
Order Adapedonta Cossmann & Peyrot, 1909
Superfamily Hiatelloidea J.E. Gray, 1824
Hiatellidae Gray, 1824
Superfamily Solenoidea Lamarck, 1809
Pharidae H. Adams & A. Adams, 1856
Solenidae Lamarck, 1809
Order Cardiida Ferussac, 1822
Superfamily Cardioidea Lamarck, 1809
Cardiidae Lamarck, 1809
Pterocardiidae Scarlato & Starobogatov, 1979 †
Superfamily Tellinoidea Blainville, 1814
Order Hippuritida Newell, 1965 †
Suborder Hippuritidina Newell, 1965 †
Superfamily Caprinoidea d'Orbigny, 1847 †
Antillocaprinidae Mac Gillavry, 1937 †
Caprinidae d'Orbigny, 1847 †
Caprinuloideidae Damestoy, 1971 †
Ichthyosarcolitidae Douvillé, 1887 †
Superfamily Radiolitoidea d'Orbigny, 1847 †
Caprinulidae Yanin, 1990 †
Caprotinidae Gray, 1848 †
Diceratidae Dall, 1895 †
Hippuritidae Gray, 1848 †
Monopleuridae Munier-Chalmas, 1873 †
Plagioptychidae Douvillé, 1888 †
Polyconitidae Mac Gillavry, 1937 †
Radiolitidae d'Orbigny, 1847 †
Trechmannellidae Cox, 1934 †
Suborder Requieniidina Skelton, 2013 †
Superfamily Requienioidea Kutassy, 1934 †
Epidiceratidae Rengarten, 1950 †
Requieniidae Kutassy, 1934 †
Incertae sedis
Superfamily Chamoidea Lamarck, 1809
Chamidae Lamarck, 1809
Superfamily Cyamioidea Sars, 1878
Cyamiidae G.O. Sars, 1878
Galatheavalvidae Knudsen, 1970
Sportellidae Dall, 1899
Superfamily Gaimardioidea Hedley, 1916
Gaimardiidae Hedley, 1916
Superfamily Galeommatoidea J.E. Gray, 1840
Basterotiidae Cossmann, 1909
Galeommatidae Gray, 1840
Kelliidae Forbes & Hanley, 1848
Lasaeidae Gray, 1842
Montacutidae W. Clark, 1855
Superfamily Gastrochaenoidea Gray, 1840
Gastrochaenidae Gray, 1840
Superfamily Kalenteroidea Marwick, 1953 †
Kalenteridae Marwick, 1953 †
Superfamily Mactroidea Lamarck, 1809
Anatinellidae Deshayes, 1853
Cardiliidae P. Fischer, 1887
Mactridae Lamarck, 1809
Mesodesmatidae Gray, 1840
Superfamily Sphaerioidea Deshayes, 1855 (1820)
Sphaeriidae Deshayes, 1855 (1820)
Superfamily Ungulinoidea Gray, 1854
Ungulinidae Gray, 1854
Order Lucinida Gray, 1854
Superfamily Lucinoidea J. Fleming, 1828
Lucinidae J. Fleming, 1828
Superfamily Thyasiroidea Dall, 1900 (1895)
Thyasiridae Dall, 1900 (1895)
Order Megalodontida Starobogatov, 1992 †
Superfamily Megalodontoidea Morris & Lycett, 1853 †
Megalodontidae Morris & Lycett, 1853 †
Pachyrismatidae Scarlato & Starobogatov, 1979 †
Order Modiomorphida Newell, 1969 †
Superfamily Modiomorphoidea S. A. Miller, 1877 †
Modiomorphidae S. A. Miller, 1877 †
Palaeopharidae Marwick, 1953 †
Order Myida Stoliczka, 1870
Superfamily Dreissenoidea Gray, 1840
Dreissenidae Gray, 1840
Superfamily Myoidea Lamarck, 1809
Corbulidae Lamarck, 1818
Erodonidae Winckworth, 1932
Myidae Lamarck, 1809
Superfamily Pholadoidea Lamarck, 1809
Pholadidae Lamarck, 1809
Teredinidae Rafinesque, 1815
Xylophagidae Purchon, 1941
Order Venerida Gray, 1854
Superfamily Arcticoidea Newton, 1891 (1844)
Arcticidae Newton, 1891 (1844)
Trapezidae Lamy, 1920 (1895)
Superfamily Cyrenoidea Gray, 1840
Cyrenidae Gray, 1840
Cyrenoididae H. Adams & A. Adams, 1857 (1853)
Glauconomidae Gray, 1853
Superfamily Glossoidea J.E. Gray, 1847 (1840)
Glossidae Gray, 1847 (1840)
Lutetiidae Zhgenti, 1976 †
Incertae sedis
Kelliellidae Fischer, 1887
Vesicomyidae Dall & Simpson, 1901
Superfamily Veneroidea Rafinesque, 1815
Isocyprinidae R. N. Gardner, 2005 †
Neoleptonidae Thiele, 1934
Veneridae Rafinesque, 1815

Bivalve taxonomy